The Call of Duty Championship 2013 was held from April 5–7, 2013 and was won by Fariko Impact with a roster of Adam “Killa” Sloss, Chris “Parasite” Duarte, Marcus “MiRx” Carter and Damon "Karma" Barlow over Team EnVyUs, with a roster of Tosh "StaiNViLLe" Mcgruder, Raymond "Rambo" Lussier, Jordan "JKap" Kaplan, Jordan "ProoFy" Cannon.

Call of Duty: Black Ops II is a first-person shooter video game.

Placings

Top 8

References

External links

2013 in esports
Call of Duty
Call of Duty Championship